Vallangi is a village in the Palakkad district of Kerala, South India.  It forms a part of the Nemmara gram panchayat.

Demographics
, according to the Indian census, Vallangi had a population of 16,608 with 8,109 males and 8,499 females.

See also
 Nelliampathi
 Pothundi Dam

References

Villages in Palakkad district